President of the Senate of Antigua and Barbuda is the presiding officer in the Senate of Antigua and Barbuda. The president's annual salary is XCD 42,000.

This is an incomplete list of the presidents of the Senate of Antigua and Barbuda:

Sources

Politics of Antigua and Barbuda
Antigua and Barbuda, Senate
Lists of Antigua and Barbuda people
Antigua and Barbuda politics-related lists